Luis Enrique Fierro (born November 14, 1936 in Tulcán) is an Ecuadorian medic and poet.

He was awarded the Ecuadorian National Prize of Culture "Premio Eugenio Espejo" in 2005 by the President of Ecuador.

References

Ecuadorian poets
People from Tulcán
1936 births
Living people